Koyunlu may refer to the following places in Turkey:

 Koyunlu, Bismil
 Koyunlu, Gercüş
 Koyunlu, Göle
 Koyunlu, İnhisar
 Koyunlu, Niğde